Enrico Anselmi was an Italian racing driver, who made a name for himself racing Lancias in the early 1950s.

Racing career

Enrico Anselmi, raced internationally, primarily in sportscars between 1947 and 1957, mainly in Lancia Aprilias and Lancia Aurelias. In 1952, his big break came when Scuderia Lancia offer him the chance to drive a works Aurelia in les 24 Heures de Mans, where partnered Felice Bonetto to eighth place overall.

During this period, he enjoyed some success, scoring his only race win, in the 1951 non-championship Coppa d'Oro delle Dolomiti and finished second in the 6 Ore di Pescara. In addition, he also won his class on the Mille Miglia that season. He repeated this feat the following season and claimed another class win. Away from Sportscars, Enrico raced in just one Formula Two race, the 1951 Gran Premio del V Centenario Colombiano, but retired his Ferrari 166. In the 1952 Targa Florio, he finished third, in the year; the Aurelia occupied the whole podium of the famous Sicilian competition.

After finishing 1st and 3rd at the 1957 Coppa Inter-Europa, held at the Autodromo Nazionale Monza, in the GT1.1 and GT2.6 classes respectively, he would retire from International Motor Sport.

Racing record

Career highlights

Complete 24 Hours of Le Mans results

Complete Mille Miglia results

References

24 Hours of Le Mans drivers
Mille Miglia drivers
World Sportscar Championship drivers
Italian racing drivers